The Promise is the fifth studio album by Vaya Con Dios. It was released in 2004, the first studio album of the band since 1995. It is the first (and only) Vaya Con Dios album with songs in Spanish and German. "Es wird schon wieder gehen" had been previously sung on the Purple Prose album.

Track listing

Charts

References

External links
The Promise at Discogs

2004 albums
Vaya Con Dios (band) albums